Pipizella annulata is a species of hoverfly, from the family Syrphidae, in the order Diptera.

References

Diptera of Europe
Pipizinae
Insects described in 1829
Taxa named by Pierre-Justin-Marie Macquart